The 1792 United States presidential election in South Carolina took place between November 2 and December 5, 1792 as part of the 1792 United States presidential election. The state legislature chose 8 members of the Electoral College, each of whom, under the provisions of the Constitution prior to the passage of the Twelfth Amendment, cast two votes for President.

South Carolina's 8 electors each cast 1 vote for the incumbent, George Washington; with 1 exception, each of those electors cast a second vote for Vice President John Adams, the outlier voting for Aaron Burr.

The Federalist Party dominated South Carolina in the 1790s as it could count a number of prominent lowcountry planters among their ranks. Many South Carolinians played important roles for the Federalist Party at the national level. The Jeffersonian-Republicans, however, were rising in prominence, especially as Charles Pinckney and Pierce Butler, both of whom signed the Constitution for South Carolina, joined the rival party. Although the Federalists dominated the state until 1800, by 1804 there were no Federalists in power. South Carolina would remain a one-party state until the start of the Civil War.

References

South Carolina
1792
1792 South Carolina elections